Christine Butegwa is a feminist, writer, entrepreneur, and gender and development activist based in Uganda. She is the author of the book titled, "The Mighty Angwech and More: Female Legends from Ugandan folklore". Christine is an interior designer and  director of Rukundo Design Décor. In 2002, she co-produced a video, "A Tale of Ten Years: The Experience of Women and Gender Studies, Makerere University with Murerwa Rian".

Work experience 
She worked with Akina Mama wa Afrika (AMwA) as  the Africa Regional Coordinator. She later served as the acting executive director at AMwA. She also served as the Gender, Rights and Advocacy Advisor at the International Planned Parenthood Federation (IPPF) Africa Regional Office based in Nairobi, Kenya. She was employed at the African Women's Development and Communication Network (FEMNET). Her key areas of interests are women's human rights, gender and development, and communications.

While at AMwA, she, on behalf  of the organisation, was in opposition of the Anti gay bill of Uganda.

See also 
 International Planned Parenthood Federation
 FEMNET
 Akina Mama wa Afrika

References

External links 
 Gender Perspectives in Arms Control and Disarmament: Views from Africa
 http://fahamubooks.org/book/?GCOI=90638100278600&fa=author&person_ID=54
 Website of International Planned Parenthood Federation
 Website of African Women's Development and Communication Network
 Website of Akina Mama wa Afrika

21st-century Ugandan women writers
Ugandan feminists
Gender studies academics
Year of birth missing (living people)
Living people